Calluga is a genus of moths in the family Geometridae.

Species
Calluga cissocosma (Turner, 1904)
Calluga costalis (Moore, 1887)
Calluga crassitibia (Warren 1901)
Calluga grammophora Prout, 1958
Calluga longispinata (Warren, 1907)
Calluga lophoceras Prout, 1931
Calluga miantosoma (Warren, 1907)
Calluga pallidipunctata (Warren, 1907)
Calluga psaphara Prout, 1929
Calluga punctinervis (Holloway, 1976)
Calluga purpureoviridis (Warren, 1903)
Calluga semirasata (Warren, 1903)
Calluga variotincta (Warren, 1907)

References

External links
Gunathilagaraj Kandasamy (2016). Checklist of Indian Geometridae with FBI number.docx. - Tamil Nadu Agricultural University

Eupitheciini
Geometridae genera